Interiors is the third album by American post-hardcore band Quicksand, released on November 10, 2017. It is the band's first studio album since Manic Compression (1995), and their first release on Epitaph Records.

History
Quicksand first disbanded in October 1995, about eight months after the release of Manic Compression, because of internal conflicts. However, the band reunited in 1997, and spent most of the following year writing new material and embarking on their first tour in three years. In August 1998, they entered Carriage House Studios in Stamford, Connecticut with producer Steven Haigler to begin recording their third album. After touring North America with Deftones and Snapcase from September to November 1998, Quicksand returned to the studio to continue working on the follow-up Manic Compression; despite a successful tour and a more collaborative effort in the writing process, resurfaced tensions would eventually split up the band indefinitely in late 1999 and doom the material to remain officially unreleased. Eight tracks from the sessions later surfaced online unofficially; however, none of them appeared on Interiors.

Speculation about new music from Quicksand surfaced in July 2013 when the band posted a photo from the studio, which was later deleted. Asked in July 2017 if it was true that they were working on new material, frontman Walter Schreifels responded, "Can't confirm or deny."

On August 21, 2017, Quicksand's Twitter feed and Walter Schreifels' Instagram account teased the title of their third album Interiors, to be released later in 2017 on Epitaph, with a 30-second video clip. On the following day, the band streamed their first single in 22 years, "Illuminant", and announced that the album would be released on November 10, 2017.

Track listing
All songs written by Alan Cage, Walter Schreifels, and Sergio Vega.

Personnel
Personnel per booklet.

Quicksand
 Walter Schreifels – vocals, guitars
 Sergio Vega – bass
 Alan Cage – drums, percussion
 Tom Capone – guitars*
*Despite Tom Capone being listed in the album's booklet, it was later revealed that he had no contributions on the album.

Production
 Will Yip – producer, mixing, sound engineer
 Vince Ratti – mixing
 Ryan Smith – mastering
 Justin Anstotz – assistant engineer
 Jay Preston – assistant engineer
 Amy Grantham – artwork
 Jason Link – layout

Charts

References

2017 albums
Quicksand (band) albums
Epitaph Records albums
Albums produced by Will Yip